Lacepede can refer to:

 Bernard Germain de Lacépède (1756–1825), French naturalist and politician.
 Lacepede Bay, a bay in South Australia.
 Lacépède, Lot-et-Garonne, a commune in France
 Lacepede Islands, a group of four islands in the NW coast of Western Australia.
 Kingston District Council, a local government area of South Australia formerly known as Lacepede District Council.